Shalom Baranes Associates, PC is an architectural design firm located in Washington, D.C., in the United States. It was founded by architect Shalom Baranes in 1981, and as of 2014 had more than 140 architect principals and associates. In 2013, it was the most active architectural firm in the Washington, D.C., metropolitan area, with 67 active projects.

About the firm
Shalom Baranes Associates (SBA) was founded in 1981 by Shalom Baranes, an architect who formerly practiced with Arthur Cotton Moore Associates.

The firm was picked in 2010 as the architect of record for Waterfront Station, a $140 million, two-building mixed-use complex atop the Waterfront Washington Metro station which the city fast-tracked in an effort to revitalize the southwest D.C. neighborhood. The following year, SBA was listed among Engineering News-Record top 500 revenue-producing design firms, with $16.9 million in revenues and 100 associates.

Shalom Baranes Associates won the American Institute of Architects' Institute Honor Award for Regional and Urban Design for their design for Burnham Place, a $7 billion development of the air rights over the Amtrak and CSX railway tracks behind the Union Station railway terminal.

The firm is also the architect for two apartment buildings which are part of the $1 billion CityCenterDC development in the heart of the District of Columbia. SBA also assisted with the master plan for the development.

For 2013, the Washington Business Journal named Shalom Baranes Associates the national capital region's busiest architectural firm, with 67 projects in active development or under construction in that year (far more than the runner-up).

Focus and statistics
In 2012, Shalom Baranes Associates had 142 architects and other professionals on staff.  The firm had clients in the public and private sector, and its projects included commercial, residential, governmental, and institutional structures.  Although the firm focused primarily on projects in the National Capital Area, its clients were international in scope. A "pure architectural services" firm, Shalom Baranes Associates was a recognized industry expert in the fields of historic preservation, project management, and urban planning.

The Washington City Paper notes that Shalom Baranes takes on projects "on the higher end of the prestige scale" and which are "more complex multi-building projects".

References

Bibliography

External links
Shalom Baranes Associates official Web site

Architecture firms based in Washington, D.C.